Eliye Springs Airport  is an airport in the Turkana County, Kenya.

Location
Eliye Springs Airport is located in Eliye Springs, a village in Turkana County in northwestern Kenya, on the western shores of Lake Turkana.

The geographic coordinates of this airport are:3° 13' 12.00"N, 36° 0' 0.00"E (Latitude:3.220000; Longitude:36.000000).

Overview
Eliye Springs Airport is a small civilian airport, serving the village of Eliye Springs.

Airlines and destinations
None at the moment.

See also
 Eliye Springs
 Lodwar
 Turkana District
 Rift Valley Province
 Kenya Airports Authority
 Kenya Civil Aviation Authority
 List of airports in Kenya

References

External links
 Location of Eliye Springs Airport At Google Maps
  Website of Kenya Airports Authority
 List of Airports In Kenya

Airports in Kenya
Airports in Rift Valley Province
Turkana County